The Niutou River is a major tributary of the Wei River, streaming north-east of Tianshui and through the town of Qingshui.

References 

Rivers of Gansu